The following lists events that happened during 1971 in Luxembourg.

Incumbents

Events
 13 February – Jean Hengen replaces the retiring Léon Lommel as Bishop of Luxembourg.
 3 April – Representing Luxembourg, Monique Melsen finishes thirteenth in the Eurovision Song Contest 1971 with the song Pomme, Pomme, Pomme.
 12 November – A law is passed granting wives the right to enter into legal agreements without the consent of their husbands.

Births
 27 November – Claude Meisch, politician
 26 December – Tom Bimmermann, composer

Deaths
 7 March – Émile Hamilius, politician

Footnotes

References
 

 
Years of the 20th century in Luxembourg
Luxembourg
1970s in Luxembourg
Luxembourg